Must See TV is an American advertising slogan that was used by NBC to brand its primetime blocks during the 1990s, and most often applied to the network's Thursday night lineup, which featured some of its most popular sitcoms and drama series of the period, allowing the network to dominate prime time ratings on Thursday nights in the 1980s and 1990s. Ratings for NBC's lineup fell during the mid-to-late 2000s, and today the network ranks behind Fox, ABC, and CBS on Thursday nights. In 2015, the network canceled comedy programming on Thursdays and switched entirely to dramas. However, the branding returned for the 2017–18 television season.

Usage
In popular culture, the phrase is most strongly associated with the network's entire Thursday night lineup, including both sitcoms and dramas, which dominated the ratings from the 1980s through the late 1990s.

As originally conceived, "Must See TV" originally applied to sitcoms only (dramas would normally be promoted separately), and for much of the 1990s the phrase was used several nights a week as an attempt at brand extension. At one point in the fall of 1997, the brand was used five nights a week, with four sitcoms a night from Monday to Thursday, and two on Sunday. NBC itself would later adopt the more common interpretation; the 2002 retrospective, 20 Years of Must See TV, focused on NBC's overall dominance on Thursday nights from 1982 onwards, and overlooked extensions such as "Must See TV Tuesday."

Success in the 1980s and 1990s
Thursday nights are coveted by advertisers due to the large proportion of young, affluent viewers that watch television on that night of the week. Of particular interest, movie advertisers promote their upcoming releases to this target demographic on Thursday night, in hopes of influencing what movies they see on the following Friday, the traditional opening night for most films outside of holiday periods and certain major film releases outside said periods.

Branding the quality Thursday night lineup began during the 1982-83 television season, which NBC promoted Fame, Hill Street Blues, Taxi (after being cancelled by ABC after its fourth season) and the then-new show Cheers as "America's Best Night of Television on Television". When the season ended, Taxi and Fame were cancelled, with the latter series being revived for new episodes in first-run syndication. However, though Cheers disappointed on ratings during its first season, instead of cancel it, the network gave the show a second chance, and it was renewed for the 1983-84 season, which saw none of its nine fall shows being renewed for a second season (one of them, We Got It Made, premiered on Thursdays during its first season, and later was revived a few years later for first-run syndication). NBC decided to move both Family Ties and Buffalo Bill from Wednesdays to Thursdays during the winter of 1984, joining Cheers, Hill Street Blues and Gimme a Break!, with newcomer Night Court joining the lineup during the summer.

What marked the beginning of NBC's dominance on Thursday nights was during the 1984-85 season, when the network premiered a new show: The Cosby Show, receiving critical acclaim, with TV Guide listing the series as "TV's biggest hit in the 1980s", adding it "almost single-handedly revived the sitcom genre and NBC's ratings fortunes". The enormous success of Cosby (which became the third-most watched show of the season in the US) also helped the other shows on its Thursday night lineup increase its ratings dramatically, with Family Ties entering the top-ten for the first time; and Cheers and Night Court both entering the top-twenty; while Hill Street Blues remained steadily on the top-thirty. When Cosby debuted, it marked a major turning point for NBC as well, as the network rose to second place at the end of the season; and reach first place at the end of the 1985-86 season, with Cosby being the number-one show in the US, which it managed to stay on that position for four more seasons until 1990. During the late 1980s, other NBC shows-turned-hits on Thursdays includes Cosby spinoff A Different World, Dear John and L.A. Law.

However, that dominance during the 1980s, would began to fade by the start of the 1990-91 season, as the strength of ABC Tuesday and Friday night lineups and Fox's decision to move The Simpsons to Thursdays to compete with Cosby contributed in part on it. Cosby slipped down to fifth place, while another NBC show, Cheers, reached number one on the Nielsen ratings for the first time. The 1991-92 and 1992-93 seasons were two of NBC's weakest, as Cheers was the only NBC show inside the top-ten during both seasons; with Cosby and A Different World ratings decreasing considerably; while Wings began to enjoy popularity among viewers on Thursday nights. Cosby ended its run in 1992; while A Different World bid farewell in 1993. That year, Seinfeld, which initially struggled from its debut in 1989 as a summer series, was moved from Wednesdays to Thursdays to join Wings and Cheers, with the latter series ending in May after 11 seasons, with its series finale being the second-highest-rated series finale of all-time behind the series finale of M*A*S*H and the highest-rated episode of the 1992–93 season in the US.

Must See TV

The "Must See" slogan was created by Dan Holm, an NBC promotional producer, during a network promo brainstorming session in June 1993 at NBC's West Coast headquarters in Burbank, California. "Must See TV" made its first appearance in NBC promotions in August 1993 and included the day of the week:  "Must See TV Thursday". In late summer of 1993, NBC wanted viewers to tune in an hour prior to Seinfeld, and created the "Must See TV" slogan to brand the comedy block. The first "Must See TV" block promo aired during late summer repeats and promoted Mad About You, Wings, Seinfeld and the then-recently-concluded Cheers, which also previewed the fall premiere of its spin-off, Frasier. The advertisement ended with the sentence "Get home early for Must See TV Thursday." The "Must See TV" slogan continued in every NBC Thursday night comedy promo throughout the 1993-94 television season to promote the 8–10 p.m. comedy block. The next season, Frasier and Wings were moved to Tuesday nights, with NBC expanding the "Must See TV" brand to include the Tuesday night comedy block: "Must See TV Tuesday". Meanwhile, the flagship Thursday block acquired two new hits, Friends - which became television's second biggest comedy behind only Seinfeld - and ER, which became the number one drama on television. Seinfeld and ER would end up battling the following four seasons for the honor of number one show, before Seinfeld ended its run in 1998. 

On November 3, 1994, NBC's Thursday night lineup featured the "Blackout Thursday" programming stunt, in which three of the four sitcoms on that night's "Must See TV" schedule incorporated a storyline involving a power outage in New York City. The stunt started with Mad About You episode "Pandora's Box", in which Jamie Buchman (Helen Hunt) accidentally causes the blackout while trying to steal cable; it continued with the Friends episode "The One with the Blackout", featuring a sub-plot in which Chandler Bing (Matthew Perry) is trapped in an ATM vestibule with Victoria's Secret model Jill Goodacre and ended with the Madman of the People episode "Birthday in the Big House" (the Seinfeld episode that followed Friends and preceded Madman, "The Gymnast", did not have a blackout storyline though was promoted as part of the event).

As the lineup includes flagship hits such as Friends and ER, NBC dominated once again Thursday nights for the rest of the 1990s decade, with other shows joining and becoming hits for the network, such as Will & Grace, Caroline in the City, Suddenly Susan, Veronica's Closet and The Single Guy. The series finale of Seinfeld, "The Finale", became the fourth-most watched overall series finale in the US after M*A*S*H, Cheers and The Fugitive, with its ninth and final season reaching the top of the Nielsen ratings, becoming only the third show finishing its runs at the top of the ratings, following I Love Lucy and The Andy Griffith Show. Consequently, Friends emerged as NBC's biggest television show after the 1998 Seinfeld final broadcast.

Tuesday and Sunday nights
Seeing how "Must See TV" dominated prime time on Thursdays, NBC felt that the same marketing power could translate into success for Tuesday and Sunday nights.

The expansion began during the 1994-95 season, when Frasier and Wings were moved to Tuesday nights, with NBC's plan to add a second night comedy block: "Must See TV Tuesday", joining The John Larroquette Show and the short-lived sitcom The Martin Short Show (being replaced later by another new comedy, NewsRadio). The "Must See TV Tuesday" was created to compete with ABC's powerhouse Tuesday lineup, which includes flagship hits such as Home Improvement, Full House and Grace Under Fire. 

Another hit, 3rd Rock from the Sun entered the Tuesday lineup during the 1995-96 season, which also saw the debut of NBC's third night of "Must See TV" on Sunday nights, with the premiere of Brotherly Love and Minor Adjustments (both shows were later cancelled by the network during the season, and were picked up by The WB and UPN, respectively), and the move of Mad About You from Thursdays to Sundays. Other show added to its Sunday lineup, was Hope and Gloria, which also ended after one season.

Though it received heavy promotion by the network, both nights did not replicate the success of "Must See TV Thursday", as during the 1996-97 season, the Sunday night two-hour comedy was shortened to one hour, to gave priority to Dateline NBC (3rd Rock was also moved from its original Tuesday night to Sundays). Meanwhile, Wings, NewsRadio and Larroquette were moved from Tuesdays from Wednesdays, to gave priority to Mad About You which after one season on Sunday nights, it was dropped out from the lineup; and Caroline in the City, which was also moved from its original Thursday night to Tuesdays. 

The trend would continue until the 1998-99 season, when the Sunday comedy night was officially dropped out, being replaced by two hours of Dateline, followed by the NBC Sunday Night Movie. Frasier returned to Thursday nights after Seinfeld ended its run, taking its 9:00 PM timeslot (eventually it was moved back to Tuesdays starting with the 2000-01 season until the show ended in 2004).

Decline

By the early 2000s, Friends and ER were still performing strong on Thursday nights, with the former series reaching number one on the Nielsen ratings during its eighth season. However, as the decade was progressing, the "Must See TV" slogan had fallen by the wayside in NBC's promotions; more importantly, NBC had gone from the top-rated network on Thursday nights to second behind CBS, eventually third behind ABC and ultimately a distant fourth behind Fox, but NBC itself didn't develop hit shows to replace long-running staples Friends, Frasier, Seinfeld, and Will & Grace.

After airing a two-hour comedy block on Thursday for 21 straight seasons, NBC broke with tradition in 2004 by replacing the 9 p.m. hour with the hour-long reality competition program The Apprentice, although its Thursday night lineup retained its top 20 position.

Thursday programming has also become increasingly stronger on other networks. CBS was first to break through with its lineup of Survivor, CSI: Crime Scene Investigation, and later Without a Trace. For the 2010–11 season, CBS moved the highly rated comedy The Big Bang Theory, which had become the highest-rated sitcom in the United States, to the Thursday 8:00 p.m. slot, and Two and a Half Men to the 8:30 p.m. slot, which earned very strong ratings.

ABC had success on Thursday nights with its hit reality series, Dancing with the Stars, before moving the program to Mondays in 2006 (where it has remained since). In the fall of 2006, sophomore drama Grey's Anatomy was moved to Thursdays to counter CSI; ABC's lineup of Ugly Betty and Grey's Anatomy has proved successful in the 18- to 49-year-old demographic, and the 2011 transfer of Fox's American Idol, regarded as the longest reigning #1 program on U.S. television from 2004 to 2011, into the Thursday timeslot adversely affected NBC's ratings for Thursday primetime programming lineup since that television season.

The "Must See TV" slogan reappeared briefly in early 2006 with the addition of two critically acclaimed and ratings-successful comedies, My Name Is Earl and The Office, in an attempt to re-establish a four-sitcom block after the rise and fall of The Apprentice, which was moved to Monday nights.

In November 2006, NBC rebranded the Thursday format with a different slogan, "Comedy Night Done Right", and added another two critically acclaimed shows, Scrubs and 30 Rock, to the lineup, forming an entire lineup of comedy series without laugh tracks or the multiple-camera setup common with past "Must See TV" comedies.

In January 2011, NBC rebranded the night once again, renaming it "Comedy Night Done Right – All Night", adding a third hour of comedies at 10 p.m. (the network had previously run a three-hour comedy lineup once annually on Thursdays during the late 1990s and early 2000s as a programming stunt). The three-hour comedy block was discontinued in the fall of 2011, when the night reverted to two hours of comedies and one drama and, in 2012, two hours of comedy and the news magazine Rock Center.

Change and record ratings lows
Prior to the 2013 fall season, NBC cancelled or ended nine of its eleven comedies, including the long-running 30 Rock and The Office, in an effort to broaden its comedy lineup. In May 2013, NBC picked up three family comedies (The Michael J. Fox Show, Sean Saves the World and Welcome to the Family) and rebranded its Thursday night lineup as "NBC's New Family of Comedies" for the fall season.

The debut of The Michael J. Fox Show was the lowest-rated Thursday fall comedy series premiere in network history. One week later, the debut of Welcome to the Family became the new record-holder, with Sean Saves the World ranking as the second lowest ever.

On October 10, 2013, NBC tied an all-time low on Thursday nights (tied with May 17, 2012), while finishing in fourth place (or combined with programming on Spanish-language network Univision, along with Thursday Night Football on NFL Network and Major League Baseball playoff coverage on TBS, seventh) for the night. On November 21, 2013, NBC averaged a 1.0 in the adults 18–49 age bracket, its lowest ever in-season average for regularly scheduled programming on the night. On the same night, The CW defeated the NBC comedy block, a first for the network. All three shows were eventually cancelled (Welcome to the Family was pulled three episodes into its first season, while The Michael J. Fox Show and Sean Saves the World were dropped shortly before the 2014 Winter Olympics; in the case of The Michael J. Fox Show, this was despite NBC giving a 22-episode order for the series prior to its debut) and were replaced by critically acclaimed (though low-rated) Thursday night mainstays Community and Parks and Recreation in January 2014, which were joined by Hollywood Game Night in late February.

2014–16: End of comedy programming 
In May 2014, NBC announced their schedule for the upcoming fall schedule at upfronts, with only a single hour of Thursday comedy in fall for the first time since 2005. Veteran reality show The Biggest Loser would take the 8pm slot, followed by short-lived new comedies Bad Judge and A to Z and the final season of Parenthood. They also announced that breakout drama The Blacklist would take the 9pm slot at mid-season the week following the Super Bowl, hinting at the end of NBC's Thursday comedy tradition.

In December 2014, NBC announced their mid-season schedule, with three dramas scheduled on Thursday to compete with ABC. This was the first time NBC had not aired comedies on Thursday since 1981, which put the Must See TV label on hiatus for three years. The final episodes of Parks and Recreation season seven were moved to Tuesdays, possibly in an attempt to burn off the last 13 episodes.

In May 2015, it was announced that NBC's Thursday broke into the Top 50 most watched programming for the first time in five years, with The Blacklist being number 14. It was the night's best showing since The Office was in the Top 50 in the 2009–10 season. NBC Thursday repeated its success in the next season, with The Blacklist at 22 and new drama Shades of Blue at 35.

2016: Revival 

In May 2016, NBC announced the return of Thursday comedy for the 2016–17 season with returning comedy Superstore and new comedy The Good Place for the first time in two years. The network also began to broadcast the second half of the Thursday Night Football season in a simulcast with NFL Network in November, effectively breaking those shows' seasons into half-seasons.

In May 2017, NBC announced the return of the Must See TV branding, with Will & Grace and Great News set to air on Thursdays for the 2017–18 season in addition to Superstore and The Good Place. Outside of holiday specials for Will & Grace and Superstore, again all four shows had their seasons broken up by Thursday Night Football. With Fox merging the package into theirs in the 2018 season, this will not occur for NBC again for the next five seasons, and only the traditional Thanksgiving and Christmas hiatuses will happen in future seasons.

NBC Thursday night lineup history

 Lime indicates the #1 most-watched program of the season.
 Yellow indicates the top-10 most-watched programs of the season.
 Cyan indicates the top-20 most watched programs of the season.
 Magenta indicates the top-30 most watched programs of the season.
 Orange indicates the top-40 most watched programs of the season.
 Silver indicates the top-50 most watched programs of the season.

 Because of the 2007–2008 Writers Guild of America strike, shows that would regularly air were replaced with reruns and unscripted programming. A few episodes of Deal or No Deal occupied the 8:00 p.m. time slot on Thursdays during the strike.

 During the second half of the 2014–15 season, The Slap initially occupied the 8:00 p.m. time slot; it was moved to the 10:00 p.m. time slot midway through its run after Allegiance was canceled.

Other series and specials
Several series aired on Thursdays to take advantage of the huge audience. These series include:

 Night Court (summer 1984)
 Our House (September 11, 1986)
 Crime Story (September 18, 1986)
 The Tortellis (January 22, 1987)
 Roomies (March 19, 1987)
 The Bronx Zoo (March 19, 1987)
 The Days and Nights of Molly Dodd (summer 1987)
 Beverly Hills Buntz (November 5, 1987; December 24, 1987)
 Mama's Boy (November 26, 1987)
 Day by Day (March 3, 1988)
 My Two Dads (April 7, 1988)
 Dream Street (April 13, 1989)
 Tattingers (April 20, 1989)
 Baby Boom (July 13, 1989)
 FM (August 17, 1989, September 14, 1989, summer 1990)
 Sister Kate (September 21, 1989)
 Hardball (September 21, 1989)
 Mancuso, F.B.I. (October 19, 1989)
 Ann Jillian (November 30, 1989)
 Down Home (April 12, 1990; February 28, 1991)
 Seinfeld (summer 1990)
 Quantum Leap (summer 1990; June 27, 1991)
 Blossom (July 5, 1990; January 3, 1991)
 Ferris Bueller (August 23, 1990)
 Parenthood (September 6, 1990; repeat of pilot episode)
 Law & Order (September 13, 1990; October 4, 1990; October 11, 1990; June 2, 1994; spring 1997)
 American Dreamer (September 20, 1990)
 Sisters (summer 1991)
 The Adventures of Mark and Brian
 Dear John (September 19, 1991)
 Reasonable Doubts (September 26, 1991)
 The Torkelsons (January 9, 1992)
 Home Fires (June 25, 1992)
 Dateline NBC (October 8, 1992; July 29, 1993; March 31, 1994; June 16, 1994; June 30 – July 14, 1994; July 28 – August 11, 1994; August 25 – September 1, 1994; September 1, 2005)
 Mad About You (summer 1993, August 5, 1999)
 The Fresh Prince of Bel-Air (November 5, 1992)
 South Beach (August 12, 1993)
 First Person with Maria Shriver (August 26, 1993; July 21, 1994)
 seaQuest DSV (December 30, 1993)
 Sweet Justice (September 15, 1994)
 Prince Street (March 6, 1997)
 NewsRadio (August 3, 1995, June 1997)
 Men Behaving Badly (summer 1997: June 12, 1997)
 Suddenly Susan (summer 1998)
 3rd Rock from the Sun (summer 1996, July 9, 1998, summer 1999, summer 2000)
 Working (August 20, 1998)
 Frasier (August 27, 1998, September 3, 1998)
 Just Shoot Me! (August 5, 1999, summer 2000)
 Will & Grace (c. spring-summer 2000)
 Las Vegas (July 8, 2004)
 Medical Investigation (September 9, 2004)
 Medium (January 6, 2005)

Specials that the network has aired on Thursdays to take advantage of the audience on that night:
Michael Nesmith in Television Parts (March 7, 1985)
Bigshots in America (June 20, 1985)
Phil Donahue Examines the Human Animal (August 14, 1986)
The Tonight Show Starring Johnny Carson: 24th Anniversary (September 25, 1986)
Splitting Image: The 1987 Movie Awards (March 26, 1987)
The Art of Being Nick (August 27, 1987)
Act II (September 3, 1987)
NBC Investigates Bob Hope (September 17, 1987)
The Tonight Show Starring Johnny Carson: 25th Anniversary (October 1, 1987)
Late Night with David Letterman: 6th Anniversary Show (February 4, 1988)
Heart and Soul (July 21, 1988)
Channel 99 (August 4, 1988)
Stand by for HNN: The Hope News Network (September 8, 1988)
The Tonight Show Starring Johnny Carson: 26th Anniversary (October 6, 1988)
Late Night with David Letterman: 7th Anniversary Show (February 2, 1989)
Jackee (May 11, 1989)
The Tonight Show Starring Johnny Carson: 27th Anniversary (October 26, 1989)
The Tonight Show Starring Johnny Carson: 28th Anniversary (September 27, 1990)
The Tonight Show Starring Johnny Carson: 29th Anniversary (October 3, 1991)
 Bob Hope's Star-Studded Comedy Special of the New Season (September 1991)
 The Funny Women of Television (October 24, 1991)
Late Night with David Letterman: 10th Anniversary Show (February 6, 1992)
 The Comedy Store's 20th Anniversary (September 24, 1992)
 A Spinal Tap Reunion (December 31, 1992)
 Hillary: America's First Lady (June 10, 1993)
 The Michael Jordan Special (August 5, 1993)
 The Seinfeld Story (November 2004)

Summer programming
Series airing on Thursday night during and after the run of "Must See TV" during the summer months have included Spy TV, Come To Papa, Last Comic Standing, Hit Me, Baby, One More Time, The Law Firm, Windfall and Love Bites.

Ratings
 Highest Rated Episode in the 1990s: 84.0 million viewers (Cheers: Series Finale – "One for the Road"; May 1993; 9:22 p.m.-11:00 p.m. ET)
 Highest Rated Episode in the 2000s: 52.5 million viewers (Friends: Series Finale – "The Last One"; May 6, 2004; 9:00 p.m.-10:06 p.m. ET)
 Highest Rated Episode of the line-up (Drama): 48.0 million viewers (ER: "Hell and High Water"; November 1995; 9:00 p.m.-10:00 p.m. ET)
 Highest Rated Episode of the line-up (Overall) and Peak viewership: 93.5 million viewers (Cheers: Series Finale; May 1993; 9:22 p.m.-11:00 p.m. ET)
Note: Friendss peak viewership in its 2004 series finale reached 80 million viewers as tallied by the Nielsen ratings (final 5 minutes).

See also

 Thank God It's Thursday, a primetime Thursday branding on ABC in 2014
 TGIF, a primetime Friday branding on ABC from 1989 to 2005

References

External links
NBC.com
Timeslot Source
“Must See TV”: The Rise and Fall of NBC’s Thursday Night Schedule
NBC reveals fall TV schedule: Thursday comedy shakeup
"Must See TV" creator exits
How Must See TV Lost Its Way
 A 7 episode British television series of the same name, documenting programmes that 'must be seen'. 

National Broadcasting Company
Advertising campaigns
Television programming blocks in the United States
1993 neologisms